The Little Red Lighthouse, officially Jeffrey's Hook Light, is a small lighthouse located in Fort Washington Park along the Hudson River in Manhattan, New York City, under the George Washington Bridge. It was made notable by the 1942 children's book The Little Red Lighthouse and The Great Gray Bridge, written by Hildegarde Swift and illustrated by Lynd Ward. 

The lighthouse stands on Jeffrey's Hook, a small point of land that supports the base of the eastern pier of the bridge, which connects Washington Heights in Manhattan to Fort Lee, New Jersey.

History
The first attempt to reduce Hudson River traffic accidents at Jeffrey's Hook was a red pole that was hung out over the river. A 10 candle-power light was added to the pole in 1889 to help alert the increasing river traffic to the spit of land at night. The land around Jeffrey's Hook was acquired by the city in 1896 and later became Fort Washington Park.

The early structure was built as the North Hook Beacon at Sandy Hook, New Jersey, where it stood until 1917, when it became obsolete. It was reconstructed at its current location in 1921 by the United States Lighthouse Board as part of a project to improve Hudson River navigational aids, and originally had a battery-powered lamp and a fog bell. It was operated by a part-time lighthouse keeper.

Construction on the George Washington Bridge, immediately above the lighthouse, started in 1927. When George Washington Bridge was completed in 1931, the lighthouse navigational light was considered obsolete, so the Coast Guard decommissioned it, and put it out in 1948, with the intention of auctioning it off.  The proposed dismantling of the lighthouse resulted in a public outcry, largely from children who were fans of the 1942 children's book, The Little Red Lighthouse and the Great Gray Bridge.  This led the Coast Guard to sign its deed to the New York City Department of Parks and Recreation on July 23, 1951.

The lighthouse was listed on the National Register of Historic Places as "Jeffrey's Hook Lighthouse" in 1979, and was designated a New York City Landmark in 1991.  In 2002, it was relighted by the city.

Access
Public access to the lighthouse is by the Hudson River Greenway, reachable north of the George Washington Bridge by a footbridge across the Henry Hudson Parkway at West 182nd Street and Riverside Drive, and south of the bridge by a footbridge at West 158th Street or the newer Denny Farrell Greenway Bridge (a pedestrian and bicycle bridge) at 151st Street.  The northern path is very steep immediately north of the bridge, while the southern path is flat. 

There is also a very obscure pedestrian underpass at Riverside Drive parallel to 177th Street, just south of the George Washington Bridge. It empties out on the other side of the Henry Hudson Parkway and it's a dirt path down to the lighthouse.  This YouTube video gives directions for getting to and using this obscure path. A neighborhood group (Friends of J. Hood Wright Park) in partnership with the NYC Department of Parks and Recreation does monthly cleanups of this route.

There is yet another way to get to the Little Red Lighthouse from Washington Heights.  This link shows the path using the Haven Ramp to the Little Red Lighthouse and then returns via this other path that takes you out to Riverside Drive on the west side of NewYork-Presbyterian Hospital.  From there one can walk south to 165th.

Tours of the lighthouse are given infrequently. They are arranged by the Parks Department's Urban Park Rangers, especially on the Little Red Lighthouse Festival day in late September and Open House New York day in October. The October Little Red Lighthouse Festivals in 2018 and 2019 were run by the organization Summer on the Hudson in conjunction with the Riverside Park Conservancy and the New York City Department of Parks and Recreation. There were no festivals in 2020 and 2021 due to the Covid pandemic.

In other media 
The lighthouse is an important setting in the final scenes for the 1948 film Force of Evil, and Jane Campion's neo-noir film In the Cut features the lighthouse as motif and as a filming location.

See also
List of New York City Landmarks
National Register of Historic Places listings in New York County, New York

References

External links

 Official website
 Historic House Trust

Lighthouses completed in 1921
New York City Designated Landmarks in Manhattan
Lighthouses on the National Register of Historic Places in New York City
Government buildings on the National Register of Historic Places in Manhattan
Tourist attractions in Manhattan
Washington Heights, Manhattan
Transportation buildings and structures in Manhattan
Relocated buildings and structures in New York City